The  was the office of the Republic of Venice definitively instituted in 1490 to manage public health in the city of Venice and its territories, with specific attention on preventing the spread of epidemics within the maritime republic. The magistracy was among the first health authorities in Europe to institute public inoculation projects to prevent the spread of infectious diseases.

Initially composed of three nobles, the magistracy was expanded in 1556 when two nobles were nominated in a supervisory role. The office of the Magistrato alla Sanità was retained until the Fall of the Republic of Venice, during which it was briefly replaced by a health committee and eventually superseded by other magistracies entirely.

Organisation 

In the Venetian government, the term  normally referred to a complex magistracy that was formed by the aggregation of individual committees. These could act together but, each having autonomous functions, also separately, at times with reciprocal control functions. The  was composed of two different committees and consisted in five nobles: the three  (superintendents of health) and the two  (supervisors of health). Supernumerary , with limited terms, could also be nominated by the Senate to investigate specific health-related matters.

Provveditori alla Sanità

Origin 
Venice's commercial dealings with vessels coming from other Mediterranean ports made the city particularly susceptible to foreign diseases; it was consequently one of the early urban centres in Europe to be devastated by the Black Death, the outbreak of the plague in 1347. It was in response to this outbreak that the Great Council first created a temporary committee of public health on 30 March 1348. Yet given the limited knowledge of the causes of the disease at the time and the resulting inability to enact adequate containment measures, the committee was largely tasked with the removal and burial of the highly contagious corpses.

Beginning in 1423, the authority to determine the most efficient means to contain and eradicate frequent infections and to coordinate efforts between various government offices was completely delegated to the Full College, the executive committee of the Senate. However, given the numerous duties of the Full College, ad hoc commissions had to be created during the epidemics of 1459, 1460, and 1468 in order to effectively deal with the health crises. Despite the need for a permanent committee of public health, there was resistance from other government offices whose own authority would be diminished, primarily on the part of the Salt Office whose tax revenues, derived from the government monopoly of the salt trade, largely financed the lazarets, used for quarantine on islands away from the city. Additional resistance to empowering a permanent government office stemmed from commercial interests which would be affected by the imposition of quarantine on ships and their cargo. Nevertheless, a dedicated committee, the three , was established by the Senate on 7 January 1486 (Venetian year 1485) to defend the city from the second major outbreak of the plague.

Election and term 
They were henceforth chosen from among the broader ruling patrician class and were aggregated to the Senate as an external committee with authority to propose legislation concerning health matters but without vote. The  were exonerated from the obligation to actually take part in the meetings of the Senate during their tenure, due to the need to manage urgent health-related matters. At the conclusion of their term of office, they sat in the Senate in an advisory capacity for a period equivalent to their term, initially one year but extended to sixteen months in 1745. The reform of 1745 also granted the  the right to vote in the Senate.

Sopraprovveditori alla Sanità

Origin 
This deficiency was increasingly problematic as the responsibilities of the office were increased, and it became acute during epidemics. Similar temporary committees were created during later outbreaks of the plague until 1646 when the two  were established as a permanent committee. Their principal role was to coordinate with other magistracies. They also had the full authority of the Senate to enforce the public health measures of the Magistrato alla Sanità throughout the territories of the republic.

Election and term 
The term of office, initially six months, was extended to one year in 1667.

Functions

From the offices of the magistracy, inside the public granaries near Saint Mark’s Square, it was possible to control the arrival of all ships and to prevent the disembarking of passengers and the unloading of cargo until health inspections were conducted. Upon sighting the arrival of a ship into port, observers of the magistracy, stationed in the nearby bell tower, immediately notified the magistracy so that health officials could be sent to conduct inspections. All travelers, merchants, sailors, or pilgrims, had to obtain permission to enter the city. Suspected individuals and cargo were redirected to the lazarets for quarantine.

In order to enable control and quarantine of disease outbreaks, officials of the Magistrato alla Sanità were able to impose periods of isolation of at least 14 days, upper length dependent on the situation in the port of question, and to cordon off areas of the city. Independent branches of the Venetian health services immediately discontinued trade and travel to and from Venice, functioning independently with the immediate isolation order of the Venetian Senate until the outbreak abated. Other methods of disease control included an intricate network of information and messaging, allowing for efficient reporting of and response to outbreaks, and the capacity to mobilise local coastal garrisons to carry out inspections, allowing isolation of plague-infested areas using pre-existing infrastructure. Despite these precautions, epidemics continued to occur regularly in Venice. The outbreak of plague of 1576–1577 killed around 50,000 in Venice, almost a third of the population; a similar proportion of the population was killed in 1630 in the Italian plague of 1629-31, when around 46,000 of the city's 140,000 citizens were killed.

For illnesses, they were to record the signs and symptoms, particularly those indicative of plague, and to provide the names of any doctors that had been called. Burial licenses from the Magistrato alla Sanità were required with fines imposed for any unauthorized interments. Legislation in 1553 similarly required the heads of convents, monasteries, and recovering houses to report deaths.

In all matters of public health,  obtained supreme authority. It exercised authority in supervising a wide range of professions and services: in addition to the colleges of barbers and physicians, it regularly supervised the food industry, lazarets, waste disposal, sewage and water management and mortuary services.

The  was also known to interact with prostitutes, vagrants, beggars and guesthouses, further aiding the surveillance of possible transmission of foreign maladies within their jurisdiction. 

The Venetian  was the second health provider in Italy to introduce variolation, which had only recently been introduced to Europe from eastern schools of medicine, as a means of inoculation against smallpox, preceded only by the Hospital of Santa Maria degli Innocenti in Florence, and the first to offer it freely to the public for purposes of herd immunity.

Authority 

The three  had judicial authority to enforce the laws aimed at preventing the spread of infection.

This required a four-fifths vote of the entire magistracy.

The  were authorized to receive secret accusations concerning the violation of health laws and norms, provided that the accusations were signed and included the names of at least two witnesses. Pecuniary rewards, normally amounting to one-third or one-fourth of the fine imposed on the transgressors, were typically given to the accusers as a means of encouraging collaboration. The accusations, which could be deposited in receptacles located throughout Venice and in the subject cities, generally concerned the failure to observe quarantine procedures and the removal of infected goods from the lazarets, the presence of beggars and migrants, the presence of medical charlatans and the trafficking in unauthorized medicines, the sale of infected meat or rotten food, the failure to maintain hygiene in stores and animal stalls, the polluting of the canals and streets, and unauthorized burials.

The authority of the  extended not only to the entirety of the Venetian Lagoon but also to the other cities of the Venetian Republic by means of establishing health offices in each. Extensive infrastructure was introduced in the Ionian Islands, which were viewed particularly throughout the 17th and 18th centuries as likely sources of disease outbreaks due to their proximity to Asia Minor and, by extension, the Ottoman Empire. However, in many cases, the magistracy's authority was often not direct; for example, the  lazarets were able to bypass local health authorities and report directly to the regional government in times of low disease activity, only falling under the health office's direct jurisdiction in times of emergency.

During the Fall of the Republic of Venice, as Napoleon’s troops were occupying the Republic's territory with numerous reforms to government and infrastructure, the office of the Magistrato alla Sanità was folded into the Health Committee for a short period of time before eventually being disbanded, with its duties assigned to other magistracies.

Archive

The Archive of the superintendents of health contains nearly four centuries of documentation on not only the conditions of public health and sanitation within the Venetian Republic, but also of other contemporary states, on account of the extensive information gathered by the officials from their foreign counterparts as part of their regular surveillance of potential foreign-borne epidemics. The inventory for the archive, along with an index of names and locations, was published by Salvatore Carbone in 1962.

Notes

References

Bibliography 

 Beltrami, Daniele, Storia della popolazione di Venezia dalla fine del secolo XVI alla caduta della Repubblica (Padua: Cedam, 1954)
 Da Mosto, Andrea, L'Archivio di Stato di Venezia, indice generale, storico, descrittivo ed analitico (Roma: Biblioteca d'Arte editrice, 1937)
 Maranini, Giuseppe, La Costituzione di Venezia, II (Firenze: La Nuova Italia, 1931, repr. 1974)
 Milan, Catia, Antonio Politi, and Bruno Vianello, Guida alle magistrature: elementi per la conoscenza della Repubblica veneta (Sommacampagna: Cierre, 2003) 
 Preto, Paolo, 'Lo spionaggio sanitario', in Nelli-Elena Vanzan Marchini, ed., Rotte mediterranee e baluardi di sanità (Milano: Skira, 2004), pp. 69–73 
 Semprini, Antonio History of smallpox (Storia del vaiolo).
 Tiepolo, Maria Francesca, 'Venezia', in La Guida generale degli Archivi di Stato, IV (Roma: Ministero per i beni culturali e ambientali, Ufficio centrale per i beni archivistici, 1994), pp. 857–1014, 1062–1070, 1076–1140 
 Vanzan Marchini,  Nelli-Elena, 'L'esercizio dell'assistenza e il corpo anfibio', in F. Della Peruta, ed., Sanità e Società, Veneto, Lombardia, Piemonte, Liguria, secoli XVII-XX (Udine: Casamassima, 1989), pp. 17–35
 Vanzan Marchini, Nelli-Elena, I mali e i rimedi della Serenissima (Vicenza, Neri Pozza, 1995) 
 Vanzan Marchini, Nelli-Elena, Venezia e i lazzaretti Mediterranei: catalogo della mostra nella Biblioteca Nazionale Marciana 2004 (Mariano del Friuli: Edizioni della laguna, 2004) 
 Vanzan Marchini, Nelli-Elena, 'Venezia e l'invenzione del Lazzaretto', in Nelli-Elena Vanzan Marchini, ed., Rotte mediterranee e baluardi di sanità (Milano: Skira, 2004), pp. 17–45 
 Vanzan Marchini, Nelli-Elena, Venezia e Trieste sulle rotte della ricchezza e della paura (Verona: Cierre, 2016) 
 Vanzan Marchini, Nelli-Elena, Venezia, la salute e la fede (Vittorio Veneto: De Bastiani, 2011)

Further reading 

 Vanzan Marchini, Nelli-Elena, Le leggi di sanità della Repubblica di Venezia, I (Vicenza: Neri Pozzi, 1995) 
 Vanzan Marchini, Nelli-Elena, Le leggi di sanità della Repubblica di Venezia, II (Vicenza: Neri Pozzi, 1998) 
 Vanzan Marchini, Nelli-Elena, Le leggi di sanità della Repubblica di Venezia, III (Treviso: Canova, 2000) 
 Vanzan Marchini, Nelli-Elena, Le leggi di sanità della Repubblica di Venezia, IV (Treviso: Canova, 2003) 
 Vanzan Marchini, Nelli-Elena, Le leggi di sanità della Repubblica di Venezia, V (Treviso: Canova, 2012) 

Government of the Republic of Venice
Culture of the Republic of Venice
1485 establishments in Europe
15th-century establishments in the Republic of Venice
Health policy
History of medicine